D206 is a state road in Hrvatsko Zagorje region of Croatia connecting Hum na Sutli border crossing to Slovenia to the city of Krapina and the A2 motorway Krapina interchange via D1 state road.

The road, as well as all other state roads in Croatia, is managed and maintained by Hrvatske ceste, state owned company.

Traffic volume 

Traffic is regularly counted and reported by Hrvatske ceste, operator of the road.

Road junctions and populated areas

Sources

State roads in Croatia
Krapina-Zagorje County